The Women's 100 metres freestyle event at the 2002 Commonwealth Games took place 31 July-1 August. The heats and the semi were held on 31 July, the final on 1 August.

Records
Prior to this competition, the existing world record was as follows;

Results

Heats
The 16 fastest swimmers in the heats qualified for the semifinals.

Semifinals
The eight fastest swimmers from the semifinals progressed to the final.

Final
The final was held on 1 August at 19:06.

References

Swimming at the 2002 Commonwealth Games
Commom